Willie Remembers is the fifth album of the group Rare Earth. This is the band's first attempt at producing their own original work for a whole album, instead of utilizing some cover versions and a hired producer. As a result, it did not fare as well as their past albums. "Good Time Sally" was a #67 hit.

Track listing

Side one
"Good Time Sally" (Tom Baird) – 2:52
"Every Now & Then We Get to Go on Down to Miami" (Dino Fekaris, Nick Zesses) – 3:09
"Think of the Children" (Ray Monette, Mark Olson, Pete Rivera) – 5:47
"Gotta Get Myself Back Home" (Gil Bridges, Eddie Guzman, Monette, Olson, Rivera) – 3:03
"Come With Your Lady"  (Bridges, Guzman, Monette, Olson, Rivera) – 5:50

Side two
"Would You Like to Come Along" (Bridges, Guzman, Monette, Olson, Rivera) – 2:50
"We're Gonna Have a Good Time" (Baird, Bridges, Guzman, Monette, Olson, Rivera) – 3:21
"I Couldn't Believe What Happened Last Night" (Bridges, Guzman, Monette, Olson, Rivera) – 12:10

Personnel
Rare Earth
Pete Hoorelbeke – drums, percussion, lead vocals
Gil Bridges – woodwinds, percussion, vocals
Mike Urso – bass guitar, vocals
Ray Monette – lead guitar
Mark Olson – keyboards, vocals
Ed Guzman – congas, percussion

Charts Listing

The Billboard 200 - No. 90

References

1972 albums
Rare Earth (band) albums